Kalif Alhassan (born 15 October 1990 in Accra) is a Ghanaian footballer who plays for PDX FC in USL League Two.

Career

Professional
Alhassan began his career with Ghana Premier League side Liberty Professionals in 2007, helping the club to the semifinals of the 2009 WAFU Club Championship.

In 2010, Alhassan signed with Portland Timbers of the USSF Division 2 Professional League, in hopes of staying with the club in 2011 for their inaugural season in Major League Soccer, the top tier of the United States soccer pyramid. In his first start for the Timbers, Alhassan scored in second-half stoppage time to give Portland a 1–0 victory over Puerto Rico Islanders.

In 2011 Alhassan became the third player in Major League Soccer history to open his career with assists in each of his first three home games, all Timbers wins. He scored his first MLS goal for the Timbers on the opening weekend of the 2012 MLS season, chipping the ball over Philadelphia Union goalkeeper Zac MacMath to seal the Timbers' victory at 3–1. In addition to his goal, Alhassan assisted on another goal and earned the free kick which led to the equalizing goal.  For his performance, Alhassan was named Player of the Week for week 1 of the 2012 MLS season, becoming the first Timbers player ever to win the award.

Alhassan played 1,867 minutes in 28 matches in 2015 for Minnesota United FC. On 17 December 2015, Alhassan was released by Minnesota and picked up by the Tampa Bay Rowdies.
He then went to play for the New York Cosmos in 2017, but was released in July 2017. In August 2017, Alhassan signed for Dila Gori.

International
Alhassan began his international career in 2007 with the Ghana U-17 national team. He debuted with the Ghana U-20 national team in 2008 although he did not make the squad for the 2009 FIFA U-20 World Cup, won by Ghana. In May 2008 Alhassan was also called into a camp with the Ghana national team for the 2009 African Nations Championship, again missing out on the final squad.

Personal
Kalif is the son of former Ghana international and two-time Africa Cup of Nations winner George Alhassan.

Career statistics

Club

References

External links
 
 Kalif Alhassan at Portland Timbers

1990 births
Living people
Footballers from Accra
Ghanaian footballers
Ghanaian expatriate footballers
Liberty Professionals F.C. players
Portland Timbers (2001–2010) players
Portland Timbers players
Minnesota United FC (2010–2016) players
Tampa Bay Rowdies players
New York Cosmos (2010) players
FC Dila Gori players
OKC Energy FC players
RoundGlass Punjab FC players
USSF Division 2 Professional League players
Major League Soccer players
North American Soccer League players
Erovnuli Liga players
I-League players
Association football midfielders
Expatriate soccer players in the United States
Expatriate footballers in Georgia (country)
Expatriate footballers in India
USL League Two players